Mas is a village about six km south of Ubud, Bali, Indonesia – known for their woodcarvings. Mas is the home of the renowned Nyana & Tilem Gallery. The area also is the birthplace of the famous Mask Carver Ida Bagus Sutarja (25 November 1934 – 2 January 2002). His wife, 'Ida Ayu Madri Yadnya Swari Dewi' and offspring, respected artists in their own right, still produce unique artwork in the I.B. Sutarja – Mask Carver- Gallery.

Populated places in Bali